The Lo Nuestro Award for Pop Song of the Year is an honor presented annually by American television network Univision at the Lo Nuestro Awards. The accolade was established to recognize the most talented performers of Latin music. The nominees and winners were originally selected by a voting poll conducted among program directors of Spanish-language radio stations in the United States and also based on chart performance on Billboard Latin music charts, with the results being tabulated and certified by the accounting firm Deloitte. However, since 2004, the winners are selected through an online survey. The trophy awarded is shaped in the form of a treble clef.

The award was first presented to "Qué Te Pasa" by Mexican singer Yuri. Spanish performer Enrique Iglesias holds the record for the most awards, winning four times on three different decades, "Si Tú Te Vas" (1996), "Experiencia Religiosa" (1997), "¿Dónde Están Corazón?" (2009), and "Bailando" (2015). Puerto Rican-American singer Ricky Martin has received the award three times, and is the current holder (as of 2016) with "Disparo al Corazón". Mexican performers Camila, Ana Gabriel, Juan Gabriel, and Luis Miguel, and Colombian singer-songwriter Shakira received the award twice. Puerto Rican singer Chayanne is the most nominated artist without a win, with eight unsuccessful nominations.

Winners and nominees
Listed below are the winners of the award for each year, as well as the other nominees for the majority of the years awarded.

See also
 Billboard Latin Music Award for Latin Pop Song of the Year
 Latin Grammy Award for Best Pop Song

References

Pop Song
Latin pop songs
Pop music awards
Song awards
Awards established in 1989